The 2012–13 Cleveland State Vikings women's basketball team represented Cleveland State University in the 2012–13 NCAA Division I women's basketball season. Their head coach was Kate Peterson Abiad. The Vikings played their home games at the Wolstein Center and were members of the Horizon League. It was the 40th season of Cleveland State women's basketball. Last year they finished the season 12–19, 6–12 in Horizon League play to finish seventh overall.

Preseason
The preseason Horizon League Coaches' Poll picked the Vikings to finish fifth.

Regular season
Shalonda Winton was named to the 2012 Nugget Classic All-Tournament Team. On December 8, 2012, Cleveland State recorded their first victory over Miami (OH) in program history. On the same night Shalonda Winton also recorded just the sixth triple double in program history. On December 30, 2012, Shalonda Winton recorded another triple double against Lake Erie College.

Roster

Source:  Cleveland State Women's Basketball Roster

Schedule

|-
!colspan=12| Exhibition

|-
!colspan=12| Regular Season

|-
!colspan=12| Horizon League Tournament

Rankings

References

Cleveland State
Cleveland State Vikings women's basketball seasons